Axel Ockenfels (born 9 February 1969) is a German economist. He is professor of economics at the University of Cologne. He also is Director of the Cologne Laboratory of Economic Research, Speaker of the "University of Cologne Excellence Center for Social and Economic Behavior " (C-SEB), and Coordinator of the DFG research unit "Design & Behavior".

Career
Ockenfels received his Diplom in economics from the University of Bonn in 1994, where he studied under Reinhard Selten. He earned his doctoral degree in economics from the Otto-von-Guericke University Magdeburg in 1998, where his doctoral advisor was Joachim Weimann.

Renowned for his research on behavioral and design economics, Ockenfels is considered one of the most influential German economists, both in fundamental research and in practical market design. He publishes in leading journals in economics, but also in business administration, information systems, psychology, and sociology, as well as in application-oriented outlets. His "Theory of Equity, Reciprocity, and Competition" (co-authored with Gary E. Bolton) is one of the most cited papers in economics. Ockenfels is a Member of the Berlin-Brandenburgische and of the North Rhine-Westphalian Academy of Sciences, the Academic Advisory Board at the Federal Ministry of Economics and Technology, and Contributing Author for the Intergovernmental Panel on Climate Change (IPCC).

Other activities (selection)

Scientific organizations
 Center for European Economic Research (ZEW), Member of the Scientific Advisory Board (since 2017) 
 Karlsruhe Decision & Design Lab (KD²Lab) at the Karlsruhe Institute of Technology, Member of the Scientific Advisory Board (since 2017)
 Verein für Socialpolitik, Member of the Board (since 2016)
 University of Cologne, Member of the Scientific Advisory Board (since 2007)

Editorial boards
 Journal of Behavioral and Experimental Economics, Member of the Board of Editors (since 2013)
 Journal of Economic Behavior and Organization, Associate Editor (2004-2013)

Recognition
Ockenfels was awarded the 1.5 million Euro Gottfried Wilhelm Leibniz Prize, Germany's highest research honor, by the Deutsche Forschungsgemeinschaft (DFG) in 2005.

Selected publications 
 Behavioral economic engineering. In: Journal of Economic Psychology, Volume 33(3), (6/2012): 665–676 (with Gary E. Bolton).
 Bonus Payments and Reference Point Violations. In: Management Science, forthcoming (with Dirk Sliwka and Peter Werner).
 Engineering Trust – Reciprocity in the Production of Reputation Information. In: Management Science, Volume 59: 265–285 (with Gary E. Bolton und Ben Greiner).
 ERC – A Theory of Equity, Reciprocity and Competition. In: American Economic Review, Volume 90, (1/2000): 166-193 (with Gary E Bolton).
 Fairness, Reziprozität und Eigennutz – Ökonomische Theorie und experimentelle Evidenz. Dissertation, Tübingen 1999, .
 How Effective are Electronic Reputation Mechanisms? An Experimental Investigation. In: Management Science, Volume 50(11), (2004): 1587-1602 (with Gary E. Bolton and Elena Katok).
 Last-Minute Bidding and the Rules for Ending Second-Price Auctions: Evidence from eBay and Amazon Auctions on the Internet. In: American Economic Review, Volume 92 (4/2002): 1093–1103 (with Alvin E. Roth).
 Managers and Students as Newsvendors. In: Management Science, Volume 58(12), (2012): 2225-2233 (with Gary E. Bolton and Ulrich Thonemann).
 Similarity increases altruistic punishment in humans. In: Proceedings of the National Academy of Sciences, Volume 110, (2013): 19318–19323 (with Thomas Mussweiler).
 The Method of Agencies Coalition Formation in Experimental Games. In: Proceedings of the National Academy of Sciences, Volume 109/50, (2012): 20358-20363 (with John F. Nash, Rosemarie Nagel and Reinhard Selten).

References

External links
 Website at the University of Cologne

1969 births
Living people
German economists
University of Bonn alumni
Academic staff of the University of Cologne
Gottfried Wilhelm Leibniz Prize winners
Intergovernmental Panel on Climate Change contributing authors